Blundellsands is an area in Sefton, Merseyside, England.  It contains six buildings that are recorded in the National Heritage List for England as designated listed buildings, all of which are listed at Grade II.  This grade is the lowest of the three gradings given to listed buildings and is applied to "buildings of national importance and special interest".

The area was created as a suburb for wealthy businessmen from Liverpool by the Blundell family of Crosby Hall in the middle of the 19th century.  The listed buildings consist of domestic properties, two churches, and a drinking fountain.

References

Citations

Sources

Listed buildings in Merseyside
Lists of listed buildings in Merseyside